Hiyasota is an unincorporated community and coal town near Jerome in Somerset County, Pennsylvania, United States. Penn Smokeless Coal Company operated two mines in Hiyasota in 1918.

References

Unincorporated communities in Somerset County, Pennsylvania
Coal towns in Pennsylvania
Unincorporated communities in Pennsylvania